Anolis sheplani, the Baoruco gray twig anole or Cabral anole, is a species of lizard in the family Dactyloidae. The species is endemic to the Dominican Republic. The specific name sheplani honors the collector Bruce R. Sheplan.

References

Anoles
Lizards of the Caribbean
Reptiles of the Dominican Republic
Endemic fauna of the Dominican Republic
Reptiles described in 1974
Taxa named by Albert Schwartz (zoologist)